Lavos (ラヴォス, Ravosu) is a fictional extraterrestrial monster and the main antagonist of the 1995 role-playing video game Chrono Trigger, also appearing as an antagonist in its sequel, Chrono Cross. A parasitic alien that falls from the skies in 65,000,000 B.C., its impact results in an ice age. In the intervening time, it drains the planet's energy, until in 1999 A.D., it resurfaces, causing an apocalypse that destroys most life on the planet.

The character of Lavos became one of the most memorable antagonists in video games, and was praised by critics due to its Lovecraftian design, mysterious origins and motivations, and the player's unique ability to travel to 1999 and fight it at any time in the story, resulting in multiple potential endings, something assisted by the game's New Game Plus mode. By the same token, it was noted for lacking characterization and serving only as an evil force and motivator for the game's characters.

Characteristics 
The exterior of Lavos consists of a spiky shell that protects its true form within. It is suggested that Lavos originated as the spawn of another, similar creature, due to its life-cycle of replication. A parasite, Lavos travels from planet to planet, burrowing into the core and sapping its energy for millions of years, and collecting the DNA of its organisms for its own. Finally, upon the planet's eventual destruction, it creates Lavos Spawn, offspring that leave the planet and continue the cycle.

It is unclear whether Lavos is truly "evil", or even if it is fully sentient, as it has a general lack of dialog. It is noted as behaving similarly to an animal, and it is possible that life is simply collateral damage.

Appearances

Chrono Trigger 
Lavos initially crash-lands on the planet in 65,000,000 B.C., an event witnessed by the prehistoric Ayla, who coins the name "Lavos" by combining the Iokan words for "big" and "fire". As Lavos is a name invented by humans, its true name, if one exists, is completely unknown. The ensuing ice age causes the Reptites, an advanced species of reptilian humanoids, to go extinct, incidentally ensuring the survival of the human race. In 12,000 B.C., the Kingdom of Zeal is powered by the energy of Lavos through the use of the Mammon Machine, although this relationship is symbiotic, with Lavos also gathering the kingdom's magic. Queen Zeal attempts to use the machine to harness even more power, via her daughter, Schala. Magus intervenes, rescuing Schala, but prompting the awakening of Lavos and the destruction of Zeal. In 600 A.D., Lavos awakens yet again when the party battles Magus, causing a split in the timeline. Finally, in 1999 A.D., the "Day of Lavos", a recording shows Lavos emerging from underground and destroying the world, leaving only a few human survivors and no food. Lavos then possibly moves beneath Death Peak, where many of its spawn can be found in the post-apocalyptic world of 2300 A.D.

The battle against Lavos in 1999 A.D. starts with its outer shell, which goes through phases in which it mimics other bosses the player has fought. After the shell is defeated, the player moves inside to fight its true form, first as a giant humanoid whose arms must be destroyed before the head is vulnerable, and then as a smaller humanoid with two assisting "bits" (although the right side bit is actually the true essence of Lavos). While players can battle Lavos at any time after arriving at the End of Time, they will struggle to beat it before the recommended point in the story and achieve many of the game's multiple endings. However, New Game Plus mode allows players to defeat Lavos early with much greater ease, prompting many what-if scenarios, some of which are joke endings.

The 2008 Nintendo DS port of the game links the story to Chrono Cross by adding a hidden superboss, the Dream Devourer, the result of Schala becoming fused with Lavos following the disaster at the Ocean Palace. The Dream Devourer's defeat at the hands of Crono and his allies only momentarily frees Schala from its control, who tells Magus to forget she ever existed.

Radical Dreamers and Chrono Cross 
The interactive fiction spin-off Radical Dreamers reveals that a wayward piece of Lavos, the Frozen Flame, enabled early humans to communicate with the creature, greatly evolving them and allowing them to both use magic and create the Kingdom of Zeal. This plot point is also used in Chrono Cross, where the Frozen Flame is again a major aspect of the story. The final boss, the Devourer of Time, is a fusion of Lavos, Schala, and the Dragon God capable of destroying all of spacetime if left to its own devices. As in the previous game, there are also numerous alternate endings caused by defeating it at various times in the story.

Development 
Lavos was designed by manga artist Akira Toriyama, and its sprite was drawn by Tsutomu Terada. Due to a lack of references by Toriyama, there were many arguments within Square on how he would have designed different aspects of Lavos when creating its in-game representation. The creature has Lovecraftian influences, with its Japanese name possibly referencing Ravukurafuto, the Japanese rendering of "Lovecraft". Similar to the Great Ones of the cosmic horror genre, Lavos is also an ancient creature from beyond the known universe. However, its physical design, which is not inconceivable or amorphous, as well as its penchant for indiscriminate destruction, more resembles that of a kaiju.

Reception 
Jeremy Signor of 1UP called Lavos "mysterious" and "strange", with "a truly alien vibe that we rarely see in media" that depicts "the inherent 'otherness' of beings from another world". In Reverse Design: Chrono Trigger, Patrick Holleman stated that the boss battle against Lavos was not "especially difficult", with the initial boss rush being "a little cheesy", but that it was nevertheless an "unqualified success" due to its status as serving as the culmination of the game's story. Casey Foot of TheGamer described Lavos as "the perfect antagonist for Chrono Trigger’s story", explaining that it did not distract from the other plot points, acting as "an overarching threat" that, across different time periods, the characters must come together to defeat.

However, Bryan Vore of Game Informer critiqued Lavos as a "faceless engine of destruction" rather than a true character, saying that Magus needed to "pick up Lavos' slack".

See also 

 Characters of Chrono Trigger

References 

Chrono (series) characters
Extraterrestrial characters in video games
Fictional characters who can manipulate reality
Fictional characters who can manipulate time
Fictional mass murderers
Fictional parasites and parasitoids
Fictional monsters
Kaiju
Video game antagonists
Video game bosses
Video game characters who use magic
Video game characters with fire or heat abilities
Video game characters introduced in 1995